Doridacea is a taxonomic grouping of dorid nudibranchs, shell-less marine gastropod mollusks. included in the clade Euctenidiacea of the clade Nudibranchia.

Taxonomy
Superfamily Doridoidea
Family Dorididae
Family Actinocyclidae
Family Chromodorididae
Family Discodorididae

Superfamily Phyllidioidea
Family Phyllidiidae
Family Dendrodorididae
Family Mandeliidae

Superfamily Onchidoridoidea (= Phanerobranchiata Suctoria)
Family Akiodorididae
Family Calycidorididae
Family Goniodorididae
Family Onchidorididae
Family Corambidae 

Superfamily Polyceroidea (= Phanerobranchiata Non Suctoria)
Family Polyceridae
Family Aegiridae - In Bouchet & Rocroi (2005) Aegiretidae is an incorrect subsequent spelling.
Family Gymnodorididae
Family Hexabranchidae
Family Okadaiidae

Description
Nudibranchs in this grouping have a mantle which overlaps the sides of the foot, apart from the tail in some families. In the Superfamily Polyceroidea and the Family Goniodorididae this is often reduced to a ridge which may bear processes. There is usually a ring of external branched gills surrounding the anus towards the back of the body, but in some subgroups these gills can be located beneath the sides of the mantle (Family Phyllidiidae, Family Corambidae). Typically there are two rhinophores with lamellae which arise through the mantle towards the front of the animals.

References

Nudibranchia